The 1958 Coppa Italia Final was the final of the 1958 Coppa Italia. The match was played on 24 September 1958 between Lazio and Fiorentina. Lazio won 1–0; it was their first victory.

Match

References 
Coppa Italia 1958 statistics at rsssf.com
 https://www.calcio.com/calendario/ita-coppa-italia-1958-finale/2/
 https://www.worldfootball.net/schedule/ita-coppa-italia-1958-finale/2/

Coppa Italia Finals
Coppa Italia Final 1958
Coppa Italia Final 1958